Sir John William Frederic Nott  (born 1 February 1932) is a former British Conservative Party politician. He was a senior politician of the late 1970s and early 1980s, playing a prominent role as Secretary of State for Defence during the 1982 invasion of the Falkland Islands and subsequent Falklands War.

Early life
Born in Bideford, Devon, the son of Richard Nott and Phyllis (née Francis), Nott was educated at Bradfield College and was commissioned as a regular officer in the 2nd Gurkha Rifles (1952–1956). He served in the Malayan Emergency after a period of service with the Royal Scots. He left to study law and economics at Trinity College, Cambridge, where he was President of the Cambridge Union Society. He was called to the Bar at the Inner Temple in 1959.

Member of Parliament

Nott served as Member of Parliament (MP) for the Cornwall constituency of St Ives from 1966 to 1983. He was the last person to commence his parliamentary career under the nearly obsolete National Liberal label. The National Liberals were formally absorbed by the Conservatives in 1968, after which Nott sat as a Conservative MP. , he is the last surviving former National Liberal MP.

In 1968, he was one of the few MPs to vote against the Commonwealth Immigrants Act 1968, thinking it "disgraceful that people who had British passports should have them taken away".

In government
Nott served in the early-1970s Heath government as Minister of State at the Treasury. He joined the Shadow Cabinet in 1976 and the Cabinet when Margaret Thatcher won the 1979 general election. With this appointment to the cabinet, he was made a Privy Councillor. He served first as  Secretary of State for Trade, which incorporated the Department of Prices and Consumer Protection. Nott was responsible for repealing the prices and incomes policy and played a leading role in the abolition of Exchange Control.  The Department of Trade also covered responsibility for Shipping and Aviation and the privatisation of British Airways, the first privatisation of the Thatcher Government. He was moved to Defence in the reshuffle of January 1981.

He was widely criticised by Royal Navy chiefs over the 1981 Defence White Paper for his decision to cut back on forward government naval expenditure during the severe economic recession of the early 1980s; the reductions originally included the proposed scrapping of the Antarctic patrol ship  and the reduction of the Surface Fleet to 50 frigates and from three to two aircraft carriers.  He switched the resultant savings into nuclear submarines, naval weapon systems and air defence.

In his White Paper Command 8758 "The Falkland Campaign: The Lessons" he announced a major re-building programme costing around one billion pounds replacing all the ships, Harrier aircraft and helicopters lost during the Falklands War, including the building of five new Type 22 frigates, making the largest naval building programme in many years.  He also closed Chatham Dockyard and ended the mid-life modernisation of old frigates.   He took through Parliament the upgrading of the nuclear deterrent to the current Trident system (D5).

Resignation and retirement
Nott offered his resignation as Defence Secretary to Thatcher following the Argentinian invasion of the Falklands in March 1982. Unlike then Foreign Secretary Lord Carrington, however, the resignation was not accepted. Nott remained Secretary of State for Defence throughout the four-month conflict.  He was eventually replaced by Michael Heseltine in January 1983 after Nott decided not to seek re-election at the next General Election. In 1983 he was knighted, as a Knight Commander of the Order of the Bath.

Nott, John Major and Malcolm Rifkind are the only surviving members of Thatcher's cabinet who do not currently sit in either house of Parliament.

In 1985, he became chairman and chief executive of the banking firm Lazard Brothers, retiring in 1989. During his chairmanship a cabinet crisis took place on the future of Westland Helicopters which severely rocked the Thatcher government. Lazard Brothers acted for Westland against the Heseltine proposal for a European consortium. Among other well-publicised events was the takeover of Guinness. He was chairman of Hillsdown Holdings, a multi-national food company, the Canadian firm Maple Leaf Foods, deputy chairman of Royal Insurance. He was an adviser to APAX Partners and Freshfields.

Nott is a supporter of Brexit, the move to leave the European Union. In 2016, Nott criticised the "poisoned EU debate" in the Conservative Party, and suspended his party membership until there was a change of leadership.

Personal life
Nott met his future wife Miloska, a Slovene, at the University of Cambridge. Lady Nott was awarded an OBE in 2012 for her humanitarian work. Their son, Julian Nott, is a film composer, screenwriter and director, most famous for writing the scores for the Wallace and Gromit and Peppa Pig animated short films. Their other son, William, works for an international oil company in London. Their daughter, Sasha, is a journalist married to the former MP for East Devon, Hugo Swire, Baron Swire, and published controversial diaries about life as a parliamentarian's wife in the early 21st century. He lives on his farm at St Erth in Cornwall.

Books
The title of Nott's autobiography Here Today, Gone Tomorrow is a reference to an interview conducted by Sir Robin Day in October 1982. Day described Nott, who had already announced or was shortly to announce that he would not stand at the next election, as "a transient, here-today and, if I may say so, gone-tomorrow politician." He asked whether the public should believe the MP's statements on defence cuts. Nott promptly stood up calling the interview "ridiculous", removed his microphone and walked off the set.

Nott's second book, Mr Wonderful Takes a Cruise, was published in 2004.

In 2007, he published a family history entitled Haven't We Been Here Before.

In 2012, wrote the introduction to Stephen Tyrrell's Trewinnard – A Cornish History about his home in Cornwall.

Nott's fourth book, Mr Wonderful Seeks Immortality, was published in 2014.

In the media
Nott was interviewed about the rise of Thatcherism for the 2006 BBC TV documentary series Tory! Tory! Tory!.

In popular culture
Nott was portrayed by Clive Merrison in the 2002 BBC production of Ian Curteis's controversial The Falklands Play.
In the film The Iron Lady, Nott is played by Angus Wright.

See also
"Rejoice", a 1982 remark made by Margaret Thatcher following a statement read by Nott

References

Sources

External links
 
 
 Thatcher's First Cabinet

|-

|-

1932 births
Living people
Politicians from Bideford
People educated at Bradfield College
Alumni of Trinity College, Cambridge
Presidents of the Cambridge Union
Royal Gurkha Rifles officers
British people of the Falklands War
British Secretaries of State
Conservative Party (UK) MPs for English constituencies
English autobiographers
English historians
Members of the Parliament of the United Kingdom for St Ives
Members of the Privy Council of the United Kingdom
Secretaries of State for Defence (UK)
UK MPs 1966–1970
UK MPs 1970–1974
UK MPs 1974
UK MPs 1974–1979
UK MPs 1979–1983
John
People from St Erth
Presidents of the Board of Trade
Royal Scots officers
British Army personnel of the Malayan Emergency